The 1893 Minnesota Golden Gophers football team represented the University of Minnesota in the 1893 college football season. It was the only season under head coach Wallace Winter and it featured the second season of the Intercollegiate Athletic Association of the Northwest. Minnesota plowed undefeated through its schedule to set up an end-of-season matchup with Wisconsin for the league title. The game was a rout and the teams agreed to stop the game early after Minnesota took a 40–0 lead. Due to financial difficulties, the league disbanded after the 1893 season.

Schedule

Game summaries

Wisconsin
On November 11, 1893, Minnesota finished its season with a 40 to 0 victory over Wisconsin in Minneapolis. Left halfback Pillsbury scored four touchdowns, and right halfback Adams scored three.

Roster
 Center, James E. Madigan (captain)
 Guards, Everhart P. Harding (right guard); Augustus T. Larson (left guard)
 Tackles, Constant Larson (left tackle); William C. Muir (right tackle)
 Ends, Edgar C. Bisbee (right end); William F. Dalrymple (left end)
 Quarterback, Charles H. Van Campen
 Halfbacks, Walter N. Southworth (right half); George K. Belden (left half)
 Fullback, Henry C. Cutler
 Substitutes, Charles Adams, Ralph K. Keene, George A. Finlayson, Mason W. Spicer, W. Oakley Stout, Willis J. Walker, J. LeMoyne Danner Jr.
 Coach, Wallie Winter.

References

Minnesota
Minnesota Golden Gophers football seasons
College football undefeated seasons
Gophers